SkyRail Bahia is a proposed monorail system serving Salvador, Bahia in Brazil. Upon completion, Salvador will become the second Brazilian city to be served by a monorail line after São Paulo's Line 15.

Background
The Salvador Metro opened in 2014 and currently consists of two lines.
A metre gauge commuter rail line links Salvador with Paripe, which was proposed to be replaced by another form of rail transit following the opening of the metro.

Operations
Once fully complete in 2022, SkyRail Bahia will be a two line monorail network. The  Orange Line will connect the Salvador Metro's Accesso Norte station to Ilha de São João with 24 stations, and is expected to carry 172,000 daily passengers. The Green Line will be  with three stations, connecting São Joaquim to the neighborhood of Comércio.

References

External links
 Official site

Monorails
Rapid transit in Brazil